Fatma Yousif al-Ali  (born 1953) is a Kuwaiti journalist and short story writer. A graduate in Arabic Literature from Cairo University, in 1971 she became the first Kuwaiti woman to write a novel. She has also published four collections of short stories. She is a prominent member of the Kuwaiti Literary Association. Her work has been published in Banipal magazine.

References

Kuwaiti novelists
Kuwaiti journalists
1953 births
Living people
Cairo University alumni
Kuwaiti women journalists
20th-century women writers
Kuwaiti short story writers
Kuwaiti women novelists
Kuwaiti women short story writers
20th-century novelists
20th-century short story writers